The 2007 East Hampshire District Council election took place on 3 May 2007 to elect members of East Hampshire District Council in Hampshire England. The whole council was up for election and the Conservative Party stayed in overall control of the council.

Election result

3 Conservative and 3 Liberal Democrat candidates were unopposed at the election.

Ward results

Alton Amery

Alton Ashdell

Alton Eastbrook

Alton Westbrooke

Alton Whitedown

Alton Wooteys

Binstead and Bentley

Bramshott and Liphook

Clanfield and Finchdean

Downland

East Meon

Four Marks and Medstead

Froxfield and Steep

Grayshott

Headley

Holybourne and Froyle

Hordean Catherington and Lovedean

Horndean Downs

Horndean Hazleton & Blendworth

Horndean Kings

Horndean Murray

Lindford

Liss

Petersfield Bell Hill

Petersfield Causeway

Petersfield Heath

Petersfield Rother

Petersfield St Mary's

Petersfield St Peter's

Ropley and Tisted

Rowlands Castle

Selborne

The Hangers and Forest

Whitehill Chase

Whitehill Deadwater

Whitehill Hogmoor

Whitehill Pinewood

Whitehill Walldown

References

2007
2007 English local elections
2000s in Hampshire